Egg is a 2018 American comedy film directed by Marianna Palka and written by Risa Mickenberg. The film stars Christina Hendricks, Alysia Reiner, David Alan Basche, Anna Camp and Gbenga Akinnagbe. The plot centers on conceptual artist Tina (Reiner), when she introduces her eight-month pregnant art school rival (Hendricks) to her non-traditional surrogate Kiki (Camp), the truth comes out and the patriarchy fights to hang on.

Cast  
 Christina Hendricks as Karen
 Alysia Reiner as Tina
 David Alan Basche as Don
 Anna Camp as Kiki
 Gbenga Akinnagbe as Wayne

Release
Egg premiered at the Tribeca Film Festival on April 21, 2018. The film was released theatrically and digitally in the United States on January 18, 2019, by Gravitas Ventures.

References

External links
 

2018 films
2018 comedy films
American comedy films
2010s English-language films
Films shot in New York City
American pregnancy films
2010s pregnancy films
Films directed by Marianna Palka
2010s American films